Shem Bajura Bageine is a Ugandan politician. He is the former Minister of State for
East African Affairs in the Ugandan Cabinet. He was appointed to that position on 1 March 2015. On account of being a cabinet minister, Shem Bageine is also an ex officio Member of Parliament.

See also
Cabinet of Uganda
Parliament of Uganda
Government of Uganda
East African Community

References

External links
Website of the Parliament of Uganda
Website of Bageine & Company Limited

Living people
1960 births
Government ministers of Uganda
Members of the Parliament of Uganda
National Resistance Movement politicians
People from Western Region, Uganda
21st-century Ugandan politicians